Judikje "Jud" Simons (20 August 1904 – 20 March 1943) was a Dutch gymnast who competed in the 1928 Summer Olympics.

In 1928 she won the gold medal as member of the Dutch gymnastics team. The team was inducted into the International Jewish Sports Hall of Fame in 1997.

She was born in The Hague and was murdered in Sobibor extermination camp together with her husband Bernard, their five-year-old daughter Sonja and their three-year-old son Leon.

Notes

Further reading

External links
 profile
 Jud Simons commemoration, Yad Vashem website

1904 births
1943 deaths
Dutch female artistic gymnasts
Jewish Dutch sportspeople
Dutch Jews who died in the Holocaust
Gymnasts at the 1928 Summer Olympics
Jewish gymnasts
Olympic gold medalists for the Netherlands
Olympic gymnasts of the Netherlands
Gymnasts from The Hague
Dutch people who died in Sobibor extermination camp
Dutch civilians killed in World War II
Olympic medalists in gymnastics
International Jewish Sports Hall of Fame inductees
Medalists at the 1928 Summer Olympics
20th-century Dutch women
20th-century Dutch people